Skirbeck Wapentake was an administrative unit in the Parts of Holland Lincolnshire, England from the early eleventh century at the latest, until the wapentakes were abolished by the Local Government Act of 1888.

In most of England, the corresponding unit was the hundred, which was in principle, a grouping of a hundred households. Around a thousand years ago, it was important as a unit for gathering taxes and raising men for the 'citizen' army of the time, known as the Fyrd. The idea of the hundred goes back at least to the time of Tacitus but the version called the wapentake belongs to the Danish-influenced part of England. It therefore dates in that country, from the tenth or very early eleventh century.

In 1882, White's Directory for Lincolnshire (page 94) described the wapentakes as "now of little practical value". Their potential functions had been taken over piecemeal by other units such as electoral districts, Poor-Law unions and so on.

South Holland, Lincolnshire
Wapentakes of Holland